Doug Wright (born 1962) is an American playwright, librettist, and screenplay writer.

Doug Wright may also refer to:

 Doug Wright (cricketer) (1914–1998), English cricketer
 Doug Wright (cartoonist) (1917–1983), Canadian cartoonist, best known for Nipper/Doug Wright's Family
 Doug Wright (The Bill), husband of Sgt. Nikki Wright
 Doug Wright (footballer) (1917–1992), English footballer

See also
 Douglas Wright (disambiguation)